Rhachidina is a genus of gastropods belonging to the family Cerastidae.

The species of this genus are found in Central Africa and Australia.

Species:

Rhachidina hieroglyphica 
Rhachidina usagarica

References

Gastropods